The Canadian Coast Guard (CCG) maintains a fleet of  Cape-class motor lifeboats based on a motor lifeboat design used by the United States Coast Guard. In September 2009 the CCG announced plans to add five new lifeboats, bringing the total number of Cape-class lifeboats to 36.

The vessels are staffed by a crew of four, two of whom are rescue specialists. In spite of its name, the CCGS Cape Roger is a larger patrol vessel, not a Cape-class lifeboat. The CCG also maintains some larger motor lifeboats based on Arun-class lifeboats designed in the United Kingdom.  In 2021 a contract was awarded to Ocean Pacific Marine to upgrade the class over a 7 year period.

Design
They contain two Caterpillar 3196 diesel engines providing a combined . They have two  four-blade propellers, and each ship's complement is four crew members and five passengers.

Communication options include Raytheon 152 HF-SSB and Motorola Spectra 9000 VHF50W radios, and a Raytheon RAY 430 loudhailer system. The lifeboats also support the Simrad TD-L1550 VHF-FM radio direction finder. Raytheon provides a number of other electronic systems for the lifeboats, including the RAYCHART 620, the ST 30 heading indicator and ST 50 depth indicator, the NAV 398 global positioning system, a RAYPILOT 650 autopilot system, and either the R41X AN or SPS-69 radar systems.

Class list and distribution

References

External links 

 Canadian Coast Guard Datasheet on the 47 MLB
 US Coast Guard Datasheet on the 47 MLB
 USCG COMDTINST M16114.25B 47ft Motor lifeboat operator's handbook
 Textron Marine contractor for the USCG 47 MLB
 MetalCraft Marine contractor for the CCG 47 MLB
 military.com

 
Auxiliary search and rescue ship classes